Zacharias Scott (born July 2, 1980) is a former American soccer player who last played as a defender for Seattle Sounders FC of Major League Soccer. A one-club player, Scott now serves as a periodic contributor to local Sounders television broadcasts.

Career

Youth and college
Scott grew up in Hawaii where he attended Maui High School.  He was an All State soccer player his senior season.  He then attended Gonzaga, playing on the men's soccer team from 1998 to 2001.

Professional

Scott signed with the Seattle Sounders of the USL First Division in 2002.  On October 3, 2002, he signed with the Cleveland Force of the Major Indoor Soccer League.  However, he ended the season with the San Diego Sockers. Scott signed a one-year contract with the Sockers in the fall of 2003, but took an indefinite leave of absence from the team in December 2003 and never rejoined the Sockers.

The most memorable game of Scott's 2008 season was in the quarter finals of the US Open Cup against the Kansas City Wizards, where he capped an outstanding defensive performance with the winning penalty shootout goal, sending Seattle to the semifinals for the second year in a row.

After two months on trial, Scott signed with Major League Soccer expansion side Seattle Sounders FC in February 2009.

On September 15, 2016, Scott said that he would retire at the end of the 2016 season, his 15th with the Sounders. He had been nicknamed "Mr. Sounder" by former Sounders coach Sigi Schmid for his career with the club as well as his personality.  The Sounders went on to win the MLS Cup Final in Scott's last season and he finished his playing career with one MLS title, two USL First Division titles, four U.S. Open Cups and an MLS Supporters' Shield.

On March 1, 2017, Seattle Sounders FC and the ECS supporters' group hosted a testimonial match for Scott to honor his 15 year career with the organization.

Career statistics

MLS

Honors

Seattle Sounders
A-League Western Conference Championship (1): 2004
A-League/USL-1 Commissioner's Cup (2): 2002, 2007
USL First Division Championship (2): 2005, 2007

Seattle Sounders FC
Lamar Hunt U.S. Open Cup (4): 2009, 2010, 2011, 2014
MLS Supporters' Shield: 2014
MLS Cup: 2016

References

External links

 

1980 births
Living people
American soccer players
Soccer players from Hawaii
Seattle Sounders (1994–2008) players
Seattle Sounders FC players
A-League (1995–2004) players
USL First Division players
Major League Soccer players
Gonzaga Bulldogs men's soccer players
Major Indoor Soccer League (2001–2008) players
Cleveland Force (2002–2005 MISL) players
San Diego Sockers (2001–2004) players
Association football defenders